The 2007 Ms. Olympia contest 
is an IFBB professional bodybuilding competition and part of Joe Weider's Olympia Fitness & Performance Weekend 2007 was held on September 27, 2007, at the South Hall in the Las Vegas Convention Center in Winchester, Nevada and in the Orleans Arena at The Orleans Hotel and Casino in Paradise, Nevada. It was the 28th Ms. Olympia competition held. Other events at the exhibition include the Mr. Olympia, Fitness Olympia, and Figure Olympia contests.

Prize money
 1st $30,000
 2nd $18,000
 3rd $10,000
 4th $7,000
 5th $4,000
 6th $2,000
Total: $71,000

Results
 1st - Iris Kyle
 2nd - Dayana Cadeau
 3rd - Yaxeni Oriquen-Garcia
 4th - Lisa Aukland
 5th - Heather Armbrust
 6th - Betty Pariso
 7th - Bonnie Priest
 8th - Nicole Ball
 9th - Sarah Dunlap
 10th - Annie Rivieccio
 11th - Valentina Chepiga
 12th - Tazzie Colomb
 13th - Mah-Ann Mendoza
 14th - Stephanie Kessler
 15th - Antoinette Norman

Comparison to previous Olympia results:
Same - Iris Kyle
Same - Dayana Cadeau
+4 - Yaxeni Oriquen-Garcia
+1 - Lisa Aukland
Same - Betty Pariso
-3 - Bonnie Priest
-7 - Annie Rivieccio
 -3 - Valentina Chepiga
 +1 - Tazzie Colomb
 -2 - Mah-Ann Mendoza
 -5 - Antoinette Norman

Scorecard

Attended
10th Ms. Olympia attended - Yaxeni Oriquen-Garcia
9th Ms. Olympia attended - Iris Kyle
8th Ms. Olympia attended - Dayana Cadeau, and Valentina Chepiga
7th Ms. Olympia attended - Betty Pariso
4th Ms. Olympia attended - Tazzie Colomb and Bonnie Priest
3rd Ms. Olympia attended - Lisa Aukland, Mah-Ann Mendoza, and Annie Rivieccio
2nd Ms. Olympia attended - Antoinette Norman
1st Ms. Olympia attended - Heather Armbrust, Nicole Ball, Sarah Dunlap, Stephanie Kessler
Previous year Olympia attendees who did not attend - Helen Bouchard, Heather Foster, Jitka Harazimova, Gayle Moher Colette Nelson, Brenda Raganot, Dena Westerfield

Notable events

This was Iris Kyle's 3rd overall Olympia win.

2007 Ms. Olympia Qualified

See also
 2007 Mr. Olympia

References

2007 in bodybuilding
Ms. Olympia
Ms. Olympia
History of female bodybuilding
Ms. Olympia 2007